Acrolophus simulatus is a moth of the family Acrolophidae. It was described by Walsingham in 1882. It is found in North America, including Florida and Texas.

References

Moths described in 1882
simulatus
Insects of the United States